Pyawbwe is a town in the Mandalay Division of central Myanmar.

External links
Satellite map at Maplandia.com

Populated places in Mandalay Region
Township capitals of Myanmar